Phtheochroa cymatodana is a species of moth of the family Tortricidae. It is found in France and Spain.

The wingspan is about 19 mm. Adults have been recorded on wing from May to June.

References

Moths described in 1927
Phtheochroa